Flying Jacob is a Swedish casserole composed of chicken, cream, chilli sauce, bananas, roasted peanuts and bacon. The dish is baked in an oven and is usually served with rice and a salad.

The dish was invented by Ove Jacobsson who worked in the air freight industry, hence the name. The recipe was first published in Swedish cooking magazine Allt om mat in 1976.

See also
 List of casserole dishes
 List of chicken dishes

References

External links 
 Flying Jacob, classic Swedish dish

Swedish cuisine
Casserole dishes
Chicken dishes